The lesser night gecko (Nactus coindemirensis) is a species of lizard in the family Gekkonidae. It is endemic to Mauritius.

References

Nactus
Reptiles described in 1985
Taxonomy articles created by Polbot
Reptiles of Mauritius